Jean-Alain Boumsong Somkong (born 14 December 1979) is a French former professional footballer who played as a defender. He began his senior career with French club Le Havre in 1997 before joining AJ Auxerre in 2000. His performances at Auxerre earned him a move to Rangers in 2004. One season later, he signed with Newcastle United. where he spent two seasons. In 2006, he joined Juventus, freshly relegated to Serie B and helped the club return to Serie A. He returned to France with Lyon in 2008. His last spell was at Greek Super League side Panathinaikos before ending his career in 2013. Between 2003 and 2009, he made 27 appearances scoring 1 goal for the France national team.

Club career

Early career
Boumsong was born in Douala, Cameroon, and started his career with French team Le Havre before joining AJ Auxerre. He notably scored the 89th-minute winning goal in Auxerre's 2–1 win in the 2003 French Cup Final against Paris Saint-Germain.

A long-time target for then Liverpool manager Gérard Houllier, the press speculated that it was only a matter of time before Boumsong signed for Liverpool. However, as Boumsong was a free agent, his agent, the Monaco based Scot Willie McKay negotiated the best sign-on fee to the player for Boumsong from Scottish Premier League club Rangers.

Rangers
As a result, Boumsong joined Alex McLeish at Rangers in 2004 and signed a five-year contract. Boumsong quickly adapted to the Scottish game and showed his skill as a centre-back, leading to rumours that his stay in Glasgow may be shorter than expected. Halfway through the 2004–05 season, Newcastle under new manager Graeme Souness, made an £8 million bid for him, which Rangers accepted in a deal that was finalized once the January 2005 transfer window opened. However, as Boumsong had played the requisite number of games for Rangers that season, he still received a Scottish Premiership Winners Medal, despite having been a Newcastle player for around five months by the time Rangers won the title.

Newcastle
Boumsong signed a -year contract with the Magpies.

The £8 million transfer fee raised eyebrows, as the player, being out of contract, had joined Rangers for free just months before, at which point Newcastle showed no interest in signing him. This transfer is one of those about which the Stevens inquiry report in June 2007 expressed concerns:

"There remains inconsistencies in evidence provided by Graeme Souness – a former manager of the club – and Freddy Shepherd – apparently acting in an undefined role but not as a club official – as to their respective roles in transfer negotiations."

"The inquiry is still awaiting clarification from agent Willie McKay".

However the Stevens enquiry later issued two clarifications. It said of Souness, "We wish to make it clear that inconsistencies did not exist within the evidence given by Graeme Souness to Quest concerning his role in transfers covered by the Inquiry during his time as manager of Newcastle United F.C. and neither the Premier League nor do Quest have any concerns in this regard". As regards McKay it stated: "Further to the key findings from the final Quest report published on 15 June 2007 by the Premier League, Quest would like to emphasise that, in that report, it was clear that no evidence of irregular payments was found in the transfers in the inquiry period which involved the agent Willie McKay. Quest would also like to thank Mr McKay for his cooperation with the inquiry."

He had a mixed time during his stay on Tyneside in regards to his form. During his first season at Newcastle he was praised for his defensive abilities and partnership with Titus Bramble. His popularity led to fans shouting the first syllable of his name, elongating the sound in a similar way to Arsenal fans chanting Nwankwo Kanu's name.

His second season at Newcastle however was less well received. Boumsong's defensive abilities began to lapse and was often blamed for the conceding of goals. He blamed this lapse in form on his girlfriend's illness and other personal problems.

Juventus
On 22 August 2006, Boumsong joined the recently Serie B relegated Juventus for a fee of £3.3m, with future incentives promised to Newcastle relating to Juventus' future performance. In September 2006, Boumsong scored his first Juventus goal in a game against Crotone where Juventus won 3–0. Valeri Bojinov scored the other two goals. In Boumsong's final match with Juventus, he scored a key equaliser in their Coppa Italia match against rivals Internazionale on 23 January 2008.

Lyon
On 24 January 2008, Boumsong moved to French club Olympique Lyonnais on a three-and-a-half-year contract. He stated he made this move in order to increase his chances to make Raymond Domenech's EURO 2008 squad.

He made his debut for the club in 4–1 win over Sochaux at Stade de Gerland on 8 February 2008. In the 2008–09 season, he scored his first Lyon's goal against Le Mans on 4 April 2009.

Panathinaikos
On 30 July 2010, Boumsong transferred from Olympique Lyonnais to Superleague Greece champions Panathinaikos F.C. for a fee that could rise up to €750,000. He signed a three-year contract with the Greek club, earning €1.9 million annually. Although he started the season roughly, he gradually improved his performance and gained the fans' trust. He scored his first goal in a 2–0 win against Panserraikos.

In 2012, Boumsong signed a two-year contract with the club, extending his stay at Panathinaikos until 2014. During the summer, Boumsong was declared vice-captain of the club for the 2012–13 season. He scored the opening goal in a 2–0 win against Motherwell in the first leg of the third qualifying round of the 2012–13 UEFA Champions League.

International career
Boumsong made his France debut against Japan on 20 June 2003 and went with the squad for Euro 2004, although he only made a brief appearance coming on as a substitute in one game.

He established himself as a regular starter in the national team in the 2006 World Cup qualifiers, and was called up to the squad for the 2006 World Cup, but did not see any game action during the competition because of Lillian Thuram's return to the team. Boumsong was also named in the France squad for Euro 2008.

Boumsong appeared on only one game during Euro 2008, when during the group match between France and Italy he substituted Samir Nasri. Nasri himself entered the field only 16 minutes earlier, when he replaced the injured Franck Ribéry, however when central defender Eric Abidal was sent off, French coach Raymond Domenech decided to pull off the midfielder Nasri from the field for the defender Boumsong. Four years earlier during the Euro 2004, Boumsong had been already sent to the field once as a substitute's substitute, when he replaced William Gallas during a match against Switzerland, thus he is the first player in European Championship history to achieve this feat twice.

Coaching career
After retiring, Boumsong started working as a consultant for the global TV station beIN Sports. On 5 September 2018 it was confirmed, that Boumsong had been appointed assistant manager of newly hired manager Clarence Seedorf for the Cameroon national football team alongside Patrick Kluivert and Joël Epalle. He was fired in September 2019.

Style of play
Boumsong was known for his physical strength, pace and reading of the game.

Personal life
Boumsong's younger brother, Yannick Boumsong, is also a professional footballer. He is the older cousin of David N'Gog.

Career statistics

Club

International goals
Score and result list France's goal tally first, score column indicates score after Boumsong goal.

Honours
Auxerre
Coupe de France: 2002–03

Rangers
Scottish Premier League: 2004–05

Juventus
Serie B: 2006–07

Lyon
Ligue 1: 2007–08
Coupe de France: 2007–08

France
FIFA World Cup runner-up: 2006

References

External links

1979 births
Living people
Footballers from Douala
Cameroonian emigrants to France
Association football defenders
French footballers
France under-21 international footballers
France international footballers
French expatriate footballers
Expatriate footballers in Scotland
Expatriate footballers in England
Expatriate footballers in Italy
Expatriate footballers in Greece
French expatriate sportspeople in Scotland
French expatriate sportspeople in England
French expatriate sportspeople in Italy
French expatriate sportspeople in Greece
Le Havre AC players
AJ Auxerre players
Rangers F.C. players
Newcastle United F.C. players
Juventus F.C. players
Olympique Lyonnais players
Panathinaikos F.C. players
Ligue 1 players
Scottish Premier League players
Premier League players
Serie B players
Super League Greece players
2003 FIFA Confederations Cup players
UEFA Euro 2004 players
2006 FIFA World Cup players
UEFA Euro 2008 players
FIFA Confederations Cup-winning players
Black French sportspeople